Charles Elton may refer to:

Charles Elton (Born, 1993) Professional Rugby Player for Otago Rugby 

 Charles Isaac Elton (1839–1900), English lawyer, politician, writer and antiquarian
 Charles Sutherland Elton (1900–1991), English biologist
 Charles Elton (police), Chief of Police in Los Angeles, California (1900–1904)
 Charles Abraham Elton (1778–1853), English officer in the British Army and author
 Sir Charles Abraham Grierson Elton, 11th Baronet (born 1953) of the Elton baronets